Dance Mums with Jennifer Ellison is a British reality television series that made its debut on Lifetime on 20 October 2014. Created by Shiver Productions, it is set in Liverpool, England, at Jelli Studios and follows the early careers of children in dance and show business, as well as the participation of their mothers. It is a spin-off of the American TV series Dance Moms.

The second series began airing on 12 October 2015, but the show was not commissioned for a third series.

Premise
The series follows Jennifer Ellison, the owner of The Jennifer Ellison Fame Academy in Liverpool, England, as she coaches 7 girls towards the goal of competing in the Dance World Cup in Portugal.

Cast

 Jennifer Ellison: Owner of The Jennifer Ellison Fame Academy.

The Mums
 Charlotte Traynor: Sam's mother   
 Danielle Simpson: Aleah’s mother. 
 Maxine Kelly: Tayluer's mother. 
 Kathryn Creech: Harrison's mother.
 Kelly Navis: Eleiyah's mother.
 Serena McConville: Chloe's mother. 
 Lisa Kennedy: Leah Rose's mother.
 Claire Smallman: Harry's mother.

Former Mums
 Helen Thorpe-Franklin: Molly's Mother.
 Carol Greenwood:  Chloe Senior's Mother. 
 Nana Linda:  Chloe Senior's Grandmother.

Dancers
 Sam Dennis: A contemporary/commercial dancer who isn't afraid to speak her mind in the dog-eat-dog world of dance.
 Aleah Simpson: A musical theatre/contemporary dancer that is despite her mother's passion considered the underdog of the group.
 Tayluer Amos: A contemporary/lyrical dancer who is considered Jennifer's star student. Fans also call her the "UK Maddie" because of her high achievements in the world of competitive dance. 
Harrison Creech: A commercial/jazz funk dancer who was considered a threat to the other kids due to his high UK and International achievements in dance.
 Eleiyah Navis: A lyrical/contemporary/musical theatre/tap dancer who is Tayluer's rival, which results in them being compared a lot.
 Chloe Fenton: A jazz/hip hop/contemporary dancer. Due to her young age and impressive dance skills, she is considered a prodigy amongst Jennifer.
 Molly Thorpe-Franklin: A musical theatre/jazz/contemporary dancer, 'Miss Independent' Molly takes a serious approach to dancing. She is cut from the team in the last episode of season 1 along with Chloe G. due to her low success during the competition season.
 Chloe Greenwood: A lyrical/ballet dancer who has been dancing her whole life, Chloe has recently been showing signs of uninterest in dance. She is cut from the team in the last episode of season 1 along with Molly because of her uninterest in dance. She later gets called back in the season 2 episode "I Wasn't Prepared for This" and she competes with the team for the episode before leaving again.

Guest Dancers
 Josh Adedoyin:
 Angel Wharmby:

Series overview

Episodes

Series 1 (2014)

Series 2 (2015)

References

2014 British television series debuts
2015 British television series endings
British reality television series
Dance Moms
Television series by ITV Studios